Gelibolulu Mustafa Âlî bin Ahmed bin Abdülmevlâ Çelebi (b. 28 April 1541 – d. 1600) was an Ottoman historian, bureaucrat and major literary figure.

Life and work
Mustafa Ali was born on 28 April, 1541 in Gelibolu, a provincial town on the Dardanelles. His father, Ahmad, son of Mawla, was a learned man and a prosperous local merchant. The family was well-connected. Ali's uncle was Dervish Chalabi, imam to the Sultan Suleyman. The family was possibly of Bosnian ancestry.

He began his formal education at age 6 and was trained in religion and logic. At the age of 15, he began to write poetry and initially wrote under the pen-name Chasmi (The Hopeful), but before long took up the name of Âlî (The Exalted). He continued his education in Istanbul where he studied holy law, lettering and grammar. He gained employment as a cleric at the Chancery, after writing a poem, Mihr ü Mâh (The Sun and the Moon), designed to impress Prince Salim. He later entered the Court of the Sultan Suleyman, but his ambition displeased the court members and he was sent back to the Prince's Court. 

While working at the Prince's Court, he accepted an offer to serve as the confidential secretary to Lala Mustafa Pasha, a former mentor to the Prince. For the next twenty years, his life paralleled that of his employer, who by that time was a Grand Vizier. Ali's duties took him various parts of the Ottoman Empire and the Middle East including Aleppo, Damascus and Egypt.

When Prince Selim succeeded his father to the throne, Pasha and Ali entered the Royal Court in Istanbul. He used the opportunity to enter literary society and mingle with prominent literary figures of the day. However, that interlude was short-lived. Ali was assigned military duties and spent seven years in Bosnia, after which he served various administrative roles in provincial towns as far away as Baghdad and Dalmatia. He felt that these military and administrative posts were unsuited to him, as a man of letters and a man of the pen. He regularly appealed to the Court for better assignments and desperately tried to find a way back to Istanbul, to no avail. His constant frustrations and resentment, however, stimulated an active period of literary output. Many of his best works were written during this period. During his time in Baghdad, he used the opportunity to carry out research for his grand history, later published as Künhü'l-aḫbār (The Essence of History).

He became a major literary figure in the second half of the sixteenth century, and had a prolific output. He is most famous for his immense work of world history, entitled Künhü'l-aḫbār, covering the period from the creation of the world to the year 1000 of the Islamic calendar (1591/92 AD). This work remains an important primary source for 16th-century Ottoman history. He also wrote poetry as well as a work of nasihatname literature entitled Nuṣḥatü's-selāṭīn (Counsel for Sultans).

In July, 1599 he travelled to Cairo before taking up what would be his last appointment as Governor of Jeddah. He spent five months in Egypt, where he wrote a book on the customs and traditions of Cairo. He became ill in Jeddah and died there at the age of 58.

Selected writings
Ali wrote some 55 works.  Ali not only composed and penned his works, he also provided some of the illustrations. At the time, the illustration of historical works was a new trend.

 Nuṣḥatü's-selāṭīn (Counsel for Sultans), 1581
 Nusretnāme (Book of Victory), 1580 - an illustrated history of the Shirvan campaign
 Cāmi'i'l-Buhür der Mecalis-i-Sür (Gathering of the Seas), 1583
 Menlāab-i Hüner-Verān (Epic Deeds of Artists and Calligraphers), 1586 
 Ferā'i'dü'l-Vilāde (Unique Pearls  of Birth), 1587
 Künhü'l-aḫbār (The Essence of History), 1587
 Mir'atü-avālim (Mirror of Worlds), c. 1587
 Sadef-i Sad Guher (Lustre of One Hundred Jewells), 1593
 Mevadü’n-nefa'is fı qavā'idi’l Mecālı's (Table of Delicacies Concerning the Rules of Social Gatherings), 1599 - a work detailing etiquette in Cairo

Selected Illustrations from Mustafa Âlî's book,  Nusretnāme

See also
 Culture of the Ottoman Empire
 Islamic art
 Islamic calligraphy
 List of Ottoman calligraphers
 Ottoman art

References

Bibliography

External links
 Les calligraphes et les miniaturistes de l'Orient musulman by Huart, Clément – digital copy of a work that draws on Mustafa Âlî's Epic Deeds of Calligraphers and Artists 

1541 births
1600 deaths
People from Gelibolu
16th-century historians from the Ottoman Empire